Róbert Ujčík (born 19 September 1989) is a Slovak football striker who currently plays for FK Poprad/ FK Poprad II. He came from MFK Košice.

References

External links 
 MFK Košice profile

1989 births
Living people
Sportspeople from Poprad
Association football forwards
Slovak footballers
AS Trenčín players
Derby County F.C. players
SV Mattersburg players
ŠK Slovan Bratislava players
MFK Vítkovice players
Digenis Akritas Morphou FC players
FC VSS Košice players
Slovak Super Liga players
MFK Dolný Kubín players
ŠK Senec players
FK Poprad players
Slovak expatriate footballers
Expatriate footballers in England
Slovak expatriate sportspeople in England
Expatriate footballers in Austria
Slovak expatriate sportspeople in Austria
Expatriate footballers in the Czech Republic
Slovak expatriate sportspeople in the Czech Republic
Expatriate footballers in Cyprus
2. Liga (Slovakia) players
Cypriot Second Division players